Mladen Ninić (born 8 July 1950) is a Croatian rower. He competed in the men's eight event at the 1972 Summer Olympics.

References

1950 births
Living people
Croatian male rowers
Olympic rowers of Yugoslavia
Rowers at the 1972 Summer Olympics
People from Osijek-Baranja County